Baybars al-Mansoori (Rukn ad-Dīn Baybars ad-Dawadar al-Manṣūrī al-Khaṭaʾī. d. 1325) was a mamluk (slave soldier) in the service of sultan Al-Mansur Qalawun.
He is the author of a historiographical work, known as  Zubdat al-fikra fi ta'rīkh al-hijra ("quintessence of thought in Muslim history"). He was purchased from the prince of Mosul in c. 1260 and participated in several of Qalawun's campaigns during the reign of sultan Baibars (d. 1277). In 1284, he was given command of fifty horsemen. In 1287, he was appointed governor of Al Karak, a post which he held until Qalawun's death in 1290.

He was amir al-hajj in 701 AH (1302).

His Zubda is a universal chronicle which ends just prior to his death. 
A second work, Al-Tuhfa al-mulukiyya fi l-dawla al turkiyya, is based on the Zubda  and covers only the Bahri period, 1250–1325. The Zubda is by far the more informative work, but the Tuhfa contains some original content as well.
Both works rely heavily on Ibn Abd al-Zahir. Both works were written with the help of the Coptic scribe Ibn Kabar.

Notes

References
Margoliouth, D. S., "Baibars, al-Manṣūrī al-Khaṭaʾī." Encyclopaedia of Islam I (1913), 590 
Ashtor, E., "Baibars al-Mansuri", Encyclopedia of Islam I, 1127f.
Ashtor, E. [Strauss, E.] "Baibars al-Manṣūrī und Ibn al-Furāt als Geschichtsquellen für die erste Periode der Baḥrīmamluken." Ph.D. diss., University of Vienna, 1936.
Linda Northrup, From Slave to Sultan: The Career of Al-Manṣūr Qalāwūn and the Consolidation of Mamluk Rule in Egypt and Syria (678-689 A.H./1279-1290 A.D.),  Freiburger Islamstudien 18, Franz Steiner (1998), p. 38–40.
Richards, D. S., "A Mamluk Amir's Mamluk History: Baybars al-Manṣūrī and the Zubdat al-Fikra." i: The Historiography of Islamic Egypt (c. 950-1800) eds. Kennedy, Hugh, Brill, 2001, 37–44. 
Richards, D. S., "Baybars al-Manṣūrī (d. 725/1325)."  in: Encyclopedia of Arabic Literature, eds. by Scott Meisami, Julie//Starkey, Paul Routledge (1998), p. 144.
Saleh, Abdel Hamid. "Un mot sur Baybars al-Mansurī et son œuvre, la Tuḥfa." Annales islamologiques/Ḥawlīyāt Islāmīyah 20, (1984): 55–60.

Mamluks
1325 deaths
13th-century Egyptian people
14th-century Egyptian people
Egyptian historians of Islam